Ralph Lewis Knowles (born December 9, 1928) is an American professor emeritus of architecture and a leading theorist of solar access design.  He created the concept of the "solar envelope" and championed solar access planning. The solar envelope has influenced many city design and planning documents. He is a fellow of the American Solar Energy Society and an ACSA Distinguished Professor.  He received the prestigious AIA Medal for research in 1974.

Early career
After serving in the United States Navy from 1946-1948, Knowles completed a Bachelor of Architecture at North Carolina State University in 1954, and a Master of Architecture at MIT in 1959. Knowles taught briefly at Auburn University from 1959 to 1963 and then joined the faculty of the USC School of Architecture at the University of Southern California.  In 1962, Knowles applied for a Graham Foundation grant to support his research on natural forces. The research hypothesis was that  “A building made in balanced response to natural forces will exhibit differentiation useful for essential orientation in the urban landscape.”  Knowles organized the natural forces laboratory at USC, and collaborated with noted architects and educators, including Pierre Koenig, Emmett Wemple, Konrad Wachsmann, Karen M. Kensek and Douglas E. Noble.

Later career
Knowles taught at USC for 40 years, writing seven books and more than 50 articles. He served as interim Dean of the School from 1973-1975. He has presented his work at more than half of the schools of architecture in the United States. Though officially retired, Knowles continues to participate in at USC as a studio advisor and research consultant in the Chase L. Leavitt Graduate Building Science program.  His position as a leading voice in solar access design has been acknowledged by the American Institute of Architects Medal for Research and through his Fellowship award and honor as a “Passive Solar Pioneer” by the American Solar Energy Society (ASES).   He conducted groundbreaking work establishing the concept of the solar envelope, becoming recognized as a global leader for solar access design.  In the 1990s, he received a Fulbright Fellowship and spent a year teaching in eastern Europe. In September 2016, The Graduate School of Design (GSD) at Harvard University conducted a conference titled "heliomorphism" based on the work of Knowles.  Knowles was featured in an article for Metropolis Magazine in January 2017.

Published works 
Books:
Energy and Form: An Ecological Approach to Urban Growth. MIT Press. (1974, Paperback ed. 1977) 
Solar Envelope Concepts: Moderate Density Building Applications. Solar Energy Research Institute (SERI). (1979, with Richard D. Berry).
Sun Rhythm Form. MIT Press. (1981, Paperback ed. 1985) 
Energia E Forma. Padua, Italy: Franco Muzzio c. editore. Paperback. (1981, Italian translation of Energy and Form.)
Ritual House: Drawing on nature’s rhythms for architecture and urban design. Island Press. (2006) 

Selected papers:
"The solar envelope: its meaning for energy and buildings." Energy and Buildings 35.1 (2003): 15-25.
The Interstitium: A zoning strategy for seasonally adaptive architecture." (2000, co-authored with Karen M. Kensek) Proceedings of the Environmental Design Research Association (EDRA)

References

External links
Official website and papers for Ralph Lewis Knowles'

1928 births
Living people
North Carolina State University alumni
MIT School of Architecture and Planning alumni
Auburn University faculty
University of Southern California faculty